Edward Stafford may refer to:

People
Edward Stafford, 2nd Earl of Wiltshire (1470–1498)
Edward Stafford, 3rd Duke of Buckingham (1478–1521), executed for treason
Edward Stafford, 3rd Baron Stafford (1535–1603)
Sir Edward Stafford (diplomat) (1552–1605), English ambassador to Paris and MP
Edward Stafford, 4th Baron Stafford (1572–1625)
Sir Edward Stafford (politician) (1819–1901), Premier of New Zealand
Ed Stafford (born 1975), British explorer
Edward Stephen Stafford, editor of The Johns Hopkins Medical Journal

Fictional characters
 Edward Stafford (The Tudors), a fictionalized version of the 3rd Duke of Buckingham, on the TV show "The Tudors"

See also

 
 Stafford (surname)
 Stafford (disambiguation)